Hans Franz Paul Hedicke (21 August 1891 – 9 March 1949) was a German entomologist.

Background 
Hedicke was born in Magdeburg, Kingdom of Prussia in 1891. From 1923 to 1945 he was a lecturer at the Prussian Academy of Sciences.  Hedicke was an editor of the Journal Deutsche Entomologische Zeitschrift from 1921 to 1930. Hedicke died in Berlin in 1949.

References

1891 births
1949 deaths
German entomologists
20th-century German zoologists